Kovilpatti division is a revenue division in the Thoothukudi district of Tamil Nadu, India.

Kovilpatti railway station updates

References

External links 
 

Thoothukudi district